The Electoral district of Counties of Roxburgh, Phillip and Wellington and from 1851, Roxburgh and Wellington, was an electorate of the partially elected New South Wales Legislative Council, created for the first elections for the Council in 1843. The electoral district included the western counties of Roxburgh, Phillip, Wellington County. Polling took place at Montefiores, Mudgee, Bathurst and Hartley. The County of Phillip was removed from the district with the expansion of the Council in 1851 and became part of the Counties of Phillip, Brisbane and Bligh.

At all four elections, there was only one candidate who was therefore elected unopposed. In 1856 the unicameral Legislative Council was abolished and replaced with an elected Legislative Assembly and an appointed Legislative Council. The district was represented by the Legislative Assembly electorates of Roxburgh and Wellington (County).

Members

Election results

1843

1848

1851

1854

See also
Members of the New South Wales Legislative Council, 1843–1851 and 1851-1856

References

Former electoral districts of New South Wales Legislative Council
1843 establishments in Australia
1856 disestablishments in Australia